David Martin (born March 7, 1931) is a former member of the Wisconsin State Assembly.

Biography
Martin was born on March 7, 1931, in Appleton, Wisconsin. After graduating from Neenah High School in Neenah, Wisconsin, Martin attended the University of Wisconsin-Madison and the University of Michigan. He also served in the United States Army Corps of Engineers.

Political career
Martin was first elected to the Assembly in 1960. He became Assistant Majority Leader in 1967. Martin is a Republican.

References

Politicians from Appleton, Wisconsin
Politicians from Neenah, Wisconsin
Republican Party members of the Wisconsin State Assembly
Military personnel from Wisconsin
United States Army Corps of Engineers personnel
United States Army soldiers
University of Wisconsin–Madison alumni
University of Michigan alumni
1931 births
Living people